The 1976 Kansas Jayhawks football team represented the University of Kansas in the Big Eight Conference during the 1976 NCAA Division I football season. In their second season under head coach Bud Moore, the Jayhawks compiled a 6–5 record (2–5 against conference opponents), finished in seventh place in the conference, and outscored their opponents by a combined total of 260 to 251. They played their home games at Memorial Stadium in Lawrence, Kansas.

The team's statistical leaders included Nolan Cromwell with 273 passing yards, Laverne Smith with 978 rushing yards, and Waddell Smith with 221 receiving yards. Cromwell and Chris Golub were the team captains.

Schedule

References

Kansas
Kansas Jayhawks football seasons
Kansas Jayhawks football